Mr. Wong, Detective is a 1938 American crime film directed by William Nigh and starring Boris Karloff in his first appearance as Mr. Wong.

Plot

Simon Dayton is in fear for his life and seeks the help of Mr. Wong to protect him. Just prior to meeting Mr. Wong, Dayton is found dead in his office in San Francisco without a mark on him. Several witnesses testify Dayton was alone in his office that was locked from the inside.  Though the police view Dayton's death as due to a heart attack, Mr. Wong discovers a broken glass ball that contained poison gas.

Among the suspects are agents of a foreign power wishing to stop Dayton's chemicals being sent to use on the foreign power in the form of the same poison gas that killed Dayton, Dayton's business partners who will have Dayton's share of the business come to them after Dayton's death and the actual inventor of the chemical who has been cheated out of profits and recognition by Dayton.

Cast
 Boris Karloff as Mr. James Lee Wong
 Grant Withers as Capt. Sam Street
 Maxine Jennings as Myra Ross
 Evelyn Brent as Olga - aka Countess Dubois 
 George Lloyd as Devlin
 Lucien Prival as Anton Mohl
 John St. Polis as Carl Roemer
 William Gould as Theodore Meisle
 Hooper Atchley as Christian Wilk
 John Hamilton as Simon Dayton
 Wilbur Mack as Russell
 Lee Tung Foo as Tchin
 Lynton Brent as Tommy
 Grace Wood as Mrs. Roemer

See also
 List of American films of 1938
 List of films in the public domain in the United States

References

External links

 
 
 

1938 films
1930s crime films
American crime films
American black-and-white films
Films directed by William Nigh
Films set in San Francisco
Monogram Pictures films
Films about chemical war and weapons
1930s English-language films
1930s American films